Mesorhizobium sediminum is a Gram-negative, non-spore-forming, aerobic and non-motile bacterium from the genus of Mesorhizobium which has been isolated from deep-sea sediments from the Indian Ocean.

References

External links
Type strain of Mesorhizobium sediminum at BacDive -  the Bacterial Diversity Metadatabase

Phyllobacteriaceae
Bacteria described in 2016